Elise Marie Addis (born July 26, 1987) is an American soccer defender.

Career
She played for Chicago Red Stars of WPSL Elite League and was a member of the United States U-23 women's national soccer team.

References

External links
 US Soccer player profile
 Saint Louis Athletica player profile
 Notre Dame player profile

Living people
American women's soccer players
Saint Louis Athletica players
Wisconsin Badgers women's soccer players
Notre Dame Fighting Irish women's soccer players
People from Elk Grove Village, Illinois
1987 births
Women's association football defenders
Chicago Red Stars players
Women's Premier Soccer League players
Women's Premier Soccer League Elite players
Women's Professional Soccer players